State Route 705 (SR 705) is a state highway in western Ohio, a U.S. state.

Established in the late 1930s, SR 705 connects the northern half of Darke County to the city of Sidney.  The highway goes through rural areas in Darke County, passing through the villages of New Weston and Osgood heading east.  The road follows very close to the Mercer County Line throughout Darke County.  In Shelby County, Fort Loramie is the only village along the road.

Route description
Along its path, SR 705 travels through parts of the counties of Darke and Shelby.  There are no stretches of this state route that are inclusive within the National Highway System.

History
SR 705 was designated in 1937. The route has not experienced any major changes to its alignment since its inception.

Major intersections

References

705
Transportation in Darke County, Ohio
Transportation in Shelby County, Ohio